This is a list of Municipal Poets Laureate in Alberta, Canada.

Calgary
Calgary's current poet laureate is Wakefield Brewster (2022-2024). He was preceded in office by Natalie Meisner (2020 – 2022), Sheri-D Wilson (2018-2020), Micheline Maylor (2016 – 2018), Derek Beaulieu (2014 – 2016), and Kris Demeanor (2012 – 2014).

Banff
Banff has had three poets laureate, Derek Beaulieu (2022-2023), Amelie Patternson (2017-2018) and Steven Ross Smith (2019-2020)

Edmonton
The current Poet Laureate of Edmonton is Titilope Sonuga (2021-2023). She was preceded in office by Nishi Patel (2019 – 2021), Ahmed “Knowmadic” Ali (2017-2019), Pierrette Requier (2015 – 2017), Mary Pinkoski (2013 – 2015), Anna Marie Sewell (2011 – 2012), Roland Pemberton (2006 – 2011), E.D. Blodgett (2007 – 2009), and Alice Major (2005 – 2007).

See also

 Poet Laureate of Toronto
 Canadian Parliamentary Poet Laureate
 Municipal Poets Laureate in British Columbia, Canada
 Municipal Poets Laureate in Ontario, Canada

References

Poets Laureate of places in Canada